David Reece (1913–1999)  was the Archdeacon of Margam from 1971 to 1981.

Reece was educated at Gonville and Caius College, Cambridge and St. Michael's College, Llandaff; and ordained in 1937. After curacies in Aberystwyth and Llanelly he held incumbencies in Pembroke and Port Talbot.

From 1977 to 1983 he was also Assistant Bishop of Llandaff.

References

1895 births
1981 deaths
Alumni of Gonville and Caius College, Cambridge
Alumni of St Michael's College, Llandaff
Archdeacons of Margam
Bishops of Llandaff